Hugo James Rifkind (born 30 March 1977) is a British journalist. A columnist for The Times since 2005, he began presenting a Saturday morning programme on Times Radio in July 2020. He has been a regular guest on The News Quiz, on BBC Radio 4 since 2008.

Rifkind writes "My Week", a diary parody from the perspective of somebody in the news that week.

Early life and education
Hugo Rifkind was born in 1977 in Edinburgh, the son of the Conservative Party politician Sir Malcolm Rifkind and his wife Edith, daughter of Polish airforce engineer Joseph Steinberg, who was imprisoned in Siberia after the annexation of Poland and lost his first wife and daughter.

Rifkind was educated at the independent Loretto School in Musselburgh, near Edinburgh, where, he has written, he was the only Jewish pupil. He also attended George Watson's College in Edinburgh before reading philosophy at Emmanuel College, Cambridge.

Career in journalism
Rifkind began his career in journalism as an editorial assistant for the show business website Peoplenews.com, before becoming a freelance writer for The Times and the Evening Standard, and a columnist for The Herald in Glasgow from 2002 to 2005. He joined The Times in 2005, taking over the gossip column ("People") from Andrew Pierce.

In The Times, Rifkind writes a Tuesday opinion column, and a satirical diary ("My Week") in the style of a public figure in the news, and a television review column, both on Saturdays. From 2007 to 2017 he wrote a fortnightly column for The Spectator, striking a liberal, pro-European tone which ran against the magazine's conservative, Eurosceptic editorial line. Frequently his columns expressed concern about anthropogenic global warming, about which The Spectators writers are often "sceptical".

He also contributes a monthly column for GQ. Additionally, he has appeared on BBC Radio 4's satirical quiz show The News Quiz. Throughout the general election of 2015, he presented Campaign Sidebar, a Saturday morning political review show on BBC Radio 4. His debut novel, Overexposure, a satirical farce set in the London media world, was published in 2007. A compendium of his columns, My Week: The Secret Diaries Of Almost Everyone, was published in 2013.

Rifkind was named Columnist of the Year in the 2011 Editorial Intelligence Comment Awards, and Media Commentator of the Year in the same awards in 2012. He was highly commended in the Best of Humour category at the Society of Editors' Press Awards in 2012. He was Stonewall's Journalist of the Year in 2012, in recognition of his strong support for equal marriage. The same year, he was also named Best Grooming Journalist in the P&G Beauty Awards. In 2015, at the Comment Awards, he was named Arts, Culture and Entertainment Commentator of The Year. In 2017, he won both Best of Humour and Critic of the Year at the Society of Editors' Press Awards.

In August 2014, Rifkind was one of 200 public figures who were signatories to a letter to The Guardian expressing their hope that Scotland would vote to remain part of the United Kingdom in September's referendum on that issue.

In a 2011 Times column, Rifkind admitted that on 23 November 2010 he had inserted fictitious information about Queen Victoria in Wikipedia's article on the date 29 April. The information was then repeated as fact by two national newspapers (the Daily Mirror and The Daily Telegraph) the following day.

In May 2019, Rifkind presented a BBC Radio 4 programme titled Hugo Rifkind's Search For Power.

Rifkind began presenting a programme on Saturday mornings on the digital radio station Times Radio in July 2020.

Bibliography

Books
 
 My Week: The Secret Diaries of Almost Everyone (2013)

Articles

Personal life 
Rifkind is married to the German travel journalist Francisca Kellett, and they have two children.

References

External links
 List of Hugo Rifkind's articles at TimesOnline
 Hugo Rifkind, Author at The Spectator

1977 births
Living people
Alumni of Emmanuel College, Cambridge
Entertainers from Edinburgh
People educated at George Watson's College
People educated at Loretto School, Musselburgh
Scottish columnists
Scottish Jewish writers
Scottish people of Lithuanian-Jewish descent
Scottish radio personalities
Scottish unionists
The Spectator people
The Times people
Writers from Edinburgh